DeSoto County Courthouse may refer to:

DeSoto County Courthouse (Florida), Arcadia, Florida
DeSoto County Courthouse (Mississippi), Hernando, Mississippi